Jumbo Stay (formerly the Jumbo Hostel) is a hostel/hotel located inside a decommissioned Boeing 747-200 aircraft at Stockholm Arlanda Airport, Sweden. It has 33 rooms, 76 beds, and officially opened in January 2009.

History

Jumbo Stay is housed within a preserved Boeing 747-212B. The 747 was built for Singapore Airlines, and entered service in 1976 under the registration 9V-SQE. In 1984, it was sold to Pan American World Airways, for which it flew until 1991 as N727PA Clipper Belle of the Sky. Later, it operated for Cathay Pacific Airways, Garuda Indonesia, and others. Its last air operator was Transjet, a Swedish charter airline based at Arlanda Airport that went bankrupt in 2002.

The aircraft was subsequently acquired by Oscar Diös, who had previously run a youth hostel in Uppsala. Diös was developing a concept of running hostels inside many different objects, including boats, trains and lighthouses. When he found out that a retired aircraft was for sale at Arlanda Airport, he decided to try setting up an airport hostel inside it, as there were no hostels or budget hotels nearby. In December 2007, the municipality of Sigtuna granted him a building permit to establish a hostel within the aircraft, at the entrance to the airport.

Its interior had been almost entirely changed, including by the removal of 450 seats. However, a selection of its features, such as the flight controls and some of the original seats and windows, had been retained.

At its permanent site, the aircraft was mounted on a concrete foundation, and its landing gear was secured in two steel cradles. Additionally, a set of metal stairs and a lift were installed at its main entrance on its left side. 

The owner began taking bookings in late 2008, and officially opened the transformed aircraft as "Jumbo Hostel" on 15 January 2008. He also named it "Liv", after his daughter. Since then, the business name has been changed to "Jumbo Stay".

In mid-2022, a video about Jumbo Stay published by an American travel website, The Points Guy, went viral on TikTok. By 11 July 2022, the video had racked up more than 124,000 views and over 10,000 'likes'.

Description

Jumbo Stay is described by its operator as both a hostel and a hotel. It has 33 rooms with up to four beds in each. Altogether, it holds 76 beds. A large room, branded as "The Cockpit Suite", is located on the upper deck. It has a pilot's eye view through the front windows, and is equipped with an ensuite shower and toilet. A second suite, similarly equipped, is branded as "The Black Box Suite". Some of those rooms are located in the engine nacelles or wheel wells.

The former first-class area at the front of the aircraft has been converted into a cafe that sells serves breakfasts, snacks and light beverages. There are also microwave ovens for those who wish to self cater. The cafe is open to day visitors as well as guests staying overnight. It is not open in the evenings, but the Radisson Blu hotel directly across the road has a reasonably priced restaurant. In the upper deck, there is a conference lounge with eight first-class flight seats. Outside, the left-side wing has been converted into a patio and observation deck, from which aircraft moving along a nearby taxiway can be spotted.

According to the owner, the most challenging aspect of the renovation was to build something inside the aircraft's hull, which was really tight. Only  of space was available for the rooms, cafe and lounge.

Jumbo Stay is a 15-minute walk from the airport terminal and can be reached by free shuttle bus. It can also be booked for special occasions. Civil wedding ceremonies can be held on the observation deck, and receptions can be hosted in the cafe or conference lounge.

References

External links

 
 Photographs of the 747 in service with Singapore Airlines and Pan Am – on Aussie Airliners
 How to sleep in a 747 Engine: Wilbur Sargunaraj visits Jumbo Stay Stockholm – on YouTube by Wilbur Sargunaraj
 Video review of Jumbo Stay by Simply Aviation – on YouTube

Hostels
Hotels in Stockholm
Boeing 747
Hotels established in 2009
Individual aircraft
2009 establishments in Sweden
Sigtuna Municipality